State Road 79 (SR 79) is a north–south highway in the panhandle of Florida. It is a popular route for tourists to and from the Panama City Beach area. The route begins at Alabama State Route 167 at the Alabama–Florida border and runs to its southern terminus at State Road 30 in Panama City Beach, Florida.  Currently, the highway is being expanded to four lanes north of Panama City to the junction with Interstate 10.  SR 79 is a major hurricane evacuation route from the coastal area.  It is one of few designated routes northward between Pensacola and Panama City.

History
As of June 1, 2009, the route between US 98 (Back Beach Road) at Panama City Beach and SR 20 at Ebro was being expanded to four lanes.  A second bridge over the Gulf Intracoastal Waterway at West Bay has been completed and is now open making the four lane complete for about a  stretch from US 98 northward to the intersection of SR 79 and SR 388 at West Bay.  North of this completed stretch construction continues to a point just north of the Ebro Greyhound Racetrack.  No construction has begun north of this point to the Alabama state line.

Major intersections

References

External links

Florida Route Log (SR 79)

079
079
079
079
Panama City Beach, Florida